The FIBT World Championships 1962 took place in Garmisch-Partenkirchen, West Germany for the fifth time after hosting the event previously in 1934 (Four-man), 1938 (Four-man), 1953, and 1958.

Two man bobsleigh

Eugenio Monti's five straight championship victories ended when he did not qualify for the team leading to the event at Garmisch-Partenkirchen.

Four man bobsleigh

Medal table

References
2-Man bobsleigh World Champions
4-Man bobsleigh World Champions

IBSF World Championships
Sport in Garmisch-Partenkirchen
1962 in bobsleigh
International sports competitions hosted by West Germany
Bobsleigh in Germany 
1962 in German sport